This page details the career achievements of American track & field athlete Michael Johnson.  Over the course of his career, Johnson consistently dominated his events, winning almost every time he took to the track.  He set numerous world and Olympic records in short distance track, both as an individual and as a member of relay teams.  His domination of the 400 meter race is unprecedented in the history of track and field, making him arguably the greatest 400 m runner of all time.  For approximately one decade, Michael Johnson held the world records in the 200 meters, 400 meters and indoor 400 meters, as well as the world's best time in the 300 meters and the world record for the 4 by 400 meter relay.  He is still a world record holder for the 4 x 400 meter relay.  In 2004, Johnson was voted into the United States Track & Field Hall of Fame.  At the ceremony, his record-setting 200-meter performance at the 1996 Summer Olympics was deemed the greatest track and field moment in the past 25 years.  Johnson is generally considered one of the greatest and most consistent sprinters in the history of track and field.

Medal record

Olympics

World Championships

Awards
IAAF World Athlete of the Year: 1996, 1999
Men's Track & Field Athlete of the Year: 1990, 1996
Jesse Owens Award: 1994, 1995, 1996
Associated Press Athlete of the Year: 1996
Best Male Track Athlete ESPY Award: 1994, 1996, 1997, 2000
James E. Sullivan Award: 1996
Jesse Owens International Trophy: 1996, 1997

Track & Field News World Rankings

Personal bests

200 meters

400 meters
In the history of track, only 47 times has a runner run the 400 meter in less than 44 seconds.  Johnson alone accounts for 22 of these 47 sub-44 performances.

Indoor 400 meters

100 meters

300 meters

4 by 200 meters relay

4 by 400 meters relay

Records

World records

Fastest 4 x 400 meter relay leg in history: 42.91, fourth leg, United States relay team, Stuttgart, Germany
1993 IAAF World Championships Final (gold)
Other than Jeremy Wariner (USA) who ran a 42.93 split in the 2007 Osaka World Championship final, no one else has ever broken 43 seconds.
The 4 x 400 m U.S. relay team also set a world record with a time of 2:54.29.  Both records still stand.

Consecutive 400 meter finals won: 58
Johnson's eight-year winning streak in the 400 m was snapped when he finished fifth in Paris in June 1997.  Antonio Pettigrew won the race.

Largest margin of victory in the 200 meters in 55 years (1991 World Championships)
Johnson ran a Championship record 20.01, .33 seconds ahead of Frankie Fredericks.
Largest margin of victory in 200 m since Jesse Owens ran a world record 20.7, .4 seconds ahead of Mack Robinson, in the 1936 Olympics

Largest margin of victory in the 200 meters in history (1996 Olympics)
Johnson ran a world record 19.32, .36 seconds ahead of Frankie Fredericks.
Tied with Jesse Owens
Broken by Usain Bolt

Largest improvement ever on a 200 m world record: .34 seconds
Johnson broke his own record

Largest margin of victory in the 400 meters in history (1999 World Championships)
Johnson ran a world record 43.18, finishing an incredible 1.11 seconds ahead of second-place Sanderlei Claro Parrela of Brazil.

Only athlete to be ranked #1 in the world in both 200 meters and 400 meters in the same year
Five different years (1990, 1991, 1994, 1995, 1996)

First athlete to break 20 seconds in 200 meters and 44 seconds in 400 meters in a career
Also achieved by LaShawn Merritt, the second athlete to do so, Isaac Makwala, the third, and Wayde van Niekerk, the fourth athlete.

Only athlete to break 20 seconds in 200 meters and 44 seconds in 400 meters at the same meet
He first achieved this at the 1995 U.S. National Championships.

First athlete to break 45 seconds in indoor 400 meters: 44.97, Reno, NV, United States

Most gold medals won on the track: Twelve (4 Olympics, 8 World Championships)
Carl Lewis won more gold medals in track & field, but not more on the track.  Usain Bolt has broken this record, surpassing both Johnson and Lewis in the gold medal count on the track.

First athlete to win both 200 meters and 400 meters at U.S. National Championships (1995)

Olympic records

Only man to win 200 meters and 400 meters at the same Olympics (1996 Atlanta)

Only man to repeat as Olympic champion in 400 meters (1996 Atlanta, 2000 Sydney)

IAAF World Championships records

Fastest 4 x 400 meter relay leg in World Championships history: 42.91, fourth leg, United States relay team, Stuttgart, Germany
1993 IAAF World Championships Final (gold)
No one else has ever broken 43 seconds.
The 4 x 400 m U.S. relay team also set a world record with a time of 2:54.29.  Both records still stand.

Only athlete to win the 200 meters and 400 meters at the World Championships in a career (1991 Tokyo, 1993 Stuttgart)

Only athlete to win the 200 meters and 400 meters at the same World Championships (1995 Gothenburg)
This required running nine races in nine days.

Most gold medals won in World Championships history: Eight
Tied with Carl Lewis
Broken by Usain Bolt

Olympic record

200 meters

400 meters

4 by 400 meters

Achievements

AR - American record
AC - All-comers record; fastest time ever run on host nation's soil
US - Fastest time ever run on United States soil

References

Career achievements of sportspeople
American male sprinters
African-American male track and field athletes